Veera (Sanskrit and other Indian languages for "hero") may refer to:

Films and media 
 Veera (1994 film), a Tamil film directed by Suresh Krissna starring Rajnikanth
 Veera (2011 film), a Telugu film directed by A. Ramesh Varma starring Ravi Teja
 Veera (2013 film), a Kannada film directed by Ayyappa. P. Sharma starring Malashri
Veera (2018 film), a Tamil film directed by Rajaraman
 Veera (TV series), Indian TV series launched in October 2012

People 
 Veera (actor), an Indian actor
 Veerakarn or Veera Musikapong, a Thai politician
 Veera Ballala, South Indian kings of the Hoysala Empire
 Veera Ballala I
Veera Ballala II
Veera Ballala III
 Veera Baranova, an Estonian track and field athlete